Operation Beit ol-Moqaddas-2 was an offensive in the Iran–Iraq War that was started by Iran with the code of Ya-Zahra (s.a.) by the command of Sepah in Qomish-Sulaymaniyah axis (in Iraq) on January 15, 1988. During and at the end of this operation, Iran succeeded as the decisive winner.

Aftermath
The operation which was started in cold days in winter in order to capture the highlands of the west of Maoot city in Iraq, led to the capture of more than 40 hill peaks as well as several villages in the region, including Oral, Golalah, Harmadan, Bein-Dora, Sheikh-Muhammad and Yulan. There does not seem to be any mentioned statistics about the Iranian casualties, but there were high casualties and losses for Iraq, including 5400 killed, wounded, captured.

See also 
 Operation Beit ol-Moqaddas 3

References 

Jerusalem